The Dallas Children's Aquarium (Formally known as the Children's Aquarium at Fair Park) is an aquarium located in Fair Park, Dallas, Texas, USA. It opened in 1936 as part of the Texas Centennial Exposition, becoming the first Public Aquarium in the state of Texas. The aquarium received an $8 million renovation in 2010. The Aquarium has six exhibit areas.

Freshwater Zone 
The Freshwater Zone is located in the displays, Red-eared sliders, a Northern caiman lizard, an alligator snapping turtle, Longnose gars, electric eels., an Axolotl, Schneider's skink Sheltopusik, paradise flying snake, Gila trout, and various other freshwater aquatic animals.

The Intertidal Zone 
The Intertidal Zone is located in the center of the aquarium and features lined seahorse, upside-down jellyfish, Oriental sweetlips, archerfish, a tank of various cichlids and other various fish. As well as an interactive tank of red garra (also known as Doctor Fish)

Shore Zone 
Located to the left of the aquarium; The Shore Zone displays spiny lobsters, Toadfish, and batfish, rhinoceros iguana, clownfish, goatfish, four-eyed fish, red lionfish, big-belly seahorse, and more.

Near Shore 
Immediately following The Shore Zone, the Near Shore Zone displays Wolf eels, whitespotted bamboo shark, Laced moray, Atlantic sea nettles, Jellyfish, Peacock clownfish.

Offshore Zone 
The Offshore Zone is located at the far left of the aquarium and features among other animals Porcupinefish, blacktip sharks, laced morays, Common seadragon, and swell sharks.

Stingray Bay 
Stingray Bay allows guests to feed and pet cownose rays, while seeing southern stingrays, zebra sharks, Bonnethead sharks, and Mahi-mahi  As well as a plans for a new interactive tank featuring Starfish, Sea urchin Slipper lobsters, and others to open in 2022. 

Guests can book birthday parties and overnight parties that include a talk with an employee that includes a live animal and preserved parts of marine animals. Guests of the party can also feed the stingrays at Stingray Bay. Many field trips also visit the aquarium. The aquarium hosts summer and winter day camps for children in grades Pre-K to 5.

Temporary closure 
During the COVID-19 pandemic, the Aquarium was permanently closed until the ZoOceanarium Group bought the aquarium on July 23, 2021. The aquarium reopened on September 24, 2021. There are currently plans for new exhibits in 2022.

References

External links

Buildings and structures in Dallas
Culture of Dallas
Landmarks in Dallas
Economy of Dallas
Tourist attractions in Dallas
Aquaria in Texas
1936 establishments in Texas